Theodore Wharton (1875–1931) was an American film director, producer and writer. He directed 48 films in the 1910s and 1920s, including the 1915 The New Adventures of J. Rufus Wallingford featuring Oliver Hardy.

Biography
Wharton was born April 12, 1875 in Milwaukee, Wisconsin. He was the younger brother of Leopold Wharton, who was also became a film director.

In 1890, Wharton started in both the business side of the theater as well as acting in Dallas, Texas. He worked for a number of stock companies, including that of Augustin Daly until 1899, and then became a stage manager. In 1907, he visited Edison Studios and worked there until 1909. Over the next 3 years, he wrote and directed many screenplays for various studios including Essanay Studios.

In 1912, the US government commissioned him to produce The Late Indian Wars, the first sevel-reel motion picture in America. It was filmed on location in the great plains, with a script by General Charles King and a large cast including other generals and "Buffalo Bill" Cody.

The Whartons Studio opened in Ithaca, New York in 1914. Stars he directed included Francis X. Bushman, Henry B. Walthall and Beverly Bayne.
In the 1920s Wharton moved to Santa Cruz, California, as promoted by mayor Fred Swanton.
He died November 28, 1931 in Hollywood.

Selected filmography

 Abraham Lincoln's Clemency (1910)
 The Exploits of Elaine (1914)
 The New Adventures of J. Rufus Wallingford (1915)
 The New Exploits of Elaine (1915)
 The Romance of Elaine (1915)
 The Mysteries of Myra serial (1916)
 The Lottery Man (1916)
 The Black Stork (1917)
 Patria (1917)
 The Great White Trail (1917)
 The Eagle's Eye (1918)
 The Moon Riders (1920)
 The Eagle's Talons (1923)

References

External links

1875 births
1931 deaths
Film directors from Wisconsin
American male screenwriters
Writers from Milwaukee
Screenwriters from Wisconsin
Film producers from Wisconsin
20th-century American male writers
20th-century American screenwriters